The Sumathi Jury Special Award is presented annually in Sri Lanka by the Sumathi Group of Campany associated with many commercial brands to uplift the talent of Sri Lankan artists of all genre who provided their enormous contribution to the television screen. The award is given by the vote of the Jury panel, which consists of 5 to 6 senior artists.

The award was first given in 2000. Following is a list of the winners of this prestigious title since then.

References

Awards established in 2000
Sumathi Awards